Alfred Henry Markus (26 June 1937 – 30 March 2022) was a Canadian cyclist. He competed in three events at the 1956 Summer Olympics.

References

External links
 

1937 births
2022 deaths
Canadian male cyclists
Olympic cyclists of Canada
Cyclists at the 1956 Summer Olympics
Sportspeople from Toronto